"Mr. Roboto" is a 1983 song by Styx.

Mr. Roboto may also refer to:

 Mr. Roboto, a character in the film Austin Powers in Goldmember
 Mr. Roboto Project, a cooperative show space/venue in Wilkinsburg, Pennsylvania, USA
 Brendan I. Koerner (born 1974), technology columnist for The Village Voice

See also
 Mr. Robot (disambiguation)
 Roboto, a typeface
 Roboto (Masters of the Universe), a fictional character
 Robotoman (disambiguation)